Dustin Hunter Renfroe (born January 28, 1992) is an American professional baseball outfielder for the Los Angeles Angels of Major League Baseball (MLB). He has previously played in MLB for the San Diego Padres, Tampa Bay Rays, Boston Red Sox, and Milwaukee Brewers.

Renfroe received a scholarship to Mississippi State University, where he played college baseball for the Mississippi State Bulldogs. The Padres selected Renfroe in the first round of the 2013 MLB draft. He made his MLB debut in 2016, was traded to the Rays before the 2020 season, signed with the Red Sox before the 2021 season, was traded to the Brewers after the 2021 season and was then traded to the Angels after the 2022 season.

Early life
Hunter Renfroe was born and raised in Crystal Springs, Mississippi, to parents Todd and Tammy. He attended Copiah Academy in Gallman, Mississippi, where he played for the school's baseball team.

Career

Amateur career
The Boston Red Sox selected Renfroe in the 31st round of the 2010 Major League Baseball (MLB) draft, but he did not sign. He enrolled at Mississippi State University, where he played college baseball for the Mississippi State Bulldogs. On April 15, 2013, he was named the Southeastern Conference Player of the Week. He was also named to the Golden Spikes Award watchlist and was the 2013 recipient of the C Spire Ferriss Trophy, given to the best college baseball player in Mississippi. From 2011 to 2012, Renfroe played for the Bethesda Big Train of the Cal Ripken Collegiate Baseball League, where he broke the Big Train record for most runs, home runs, runs batted in, slugging percentage, and total bases in a season in 2012. Renfroe's number "11" was retired by the Big Train in 2012.

San Diego Padres
Renfroe was considered among the best prospects available in the 2013 MLB draft. The San Diego Padres selected Renfroe in the first round, with the 13th overall selection. Renfroe agreed to a $2.678 million signing bonus and began his professional career with the Eugene Emeralds of the Class A-Short Season Northwest League. After participating in the Northwest League's all-star game and registering the game-winning hit, the Padres promoted him to the Fort Wayne TinCaps of the Class A Midwest League in August.

Renfroe began the 2014 season with the Lake Elsinore Storm of the Class A-Advanced California League. In 69 games for Lake Elsinore, Renfroe had a .295 batting average, 16 home runs, and 52 runs batted in (RBIs). He was promoted to the San Antonio Missions of the Class AA Texas League during the season. Renfroe played in the 2014 All-Star Futures Game. After the season, the Padres assigned Renfroe to the Arizona Fall League to continue his development. Renfroe began the 2015 season with San Antonio and received a promotion in August to the El Paso Chihuahuas of the Class AAA Pacific Coast League. He played in 21 games for El Paso. For the season, Renfroe had a .272 average with 20 home runs and 78 RBIs, including a .333 average and six home runs with 24 RBIs with El Paso.

The Padres invited Renfroe to spring training in 2016. He opened the 2016 season with El Paso. He won the 2016 Pacific Coast League Most Valuable Player Award. Following the 2016 Triple-A Baseball National Championship Game, the Padres promoted Renfroe to the major leagues on September 21. He made his first plate appearance as a pinch hitter that same night, getting intentionally walked by Arizona Diamondbacks reliever Edwin Escobar. He batted .371 in 11 games for San Diego.

Renfroe made the Padres' Opening Day roster in 2017 as the starting right fielder. On August 19, Renfroe was optioned to El Paso due to his declining performance in reaching base. He was recalled to the majors on September 18 after the end of the Triple-A season. Renfroe finished the 2017 season with a batting line of .231/.284/.467 and 26 home runs with 117 starts in right field. Renfroe began the 2018 season primarily starting only against left-handed pitching, but picked up more starts after Wil Myers got injured. He led the Padres in home runs in 2018 with 26.

Tampa Bay Rays
On December 6, 2019, Renfroe, Xavier Edwards, and a player to be named later (PTBNL) were traded to the Tampa Bay Rays in exchange for Tommy Pham and Jake Cronenworth. The PTBNL, Esteban Quiroz, was named in March 2020. In a shortened 2020 season, Renfroe slashed .156/.252/.393 with eight home runs and 22 RBIs over 42 games. On November 20, 2020, Renfroe was designated for assignment. On November 25, 2020, Renfroe became a free agent.

Boston Red Sox
On December 14, 2020, Renfroe signed a one-year, $3.1 million contract with the Boston Red Sox. He began the season as a regular member of Boston's outfield, and hit his 20th home run with the Red Sox on August 13, having batted .256 with 68 RBIs to that point in the season. Renfroe was placed on the bereavement list on August 26, due to the death of his father. He returned to the Red Sox on August 31. Overall with Boston during the regular season, Renfroe played in 144 games while batting .259 with 31 home runs and 96 RBIs. He also played in 11 postseason games, batting 7-for-36 (.194) as the Red Sox advanced to the American League Championship Series.

Milwaukee Brewers
On December 1, 2021, the Red Sox traded Renfroe to the Milwaukee Brewers in exchange for Jackie Bradley Jr., David Hamilton, and Alex Binelas.

Los Angeles Angels
On November 22, 2022, the Brewers traded Renfroe to the Los Angeles Angels for Janson Junk, Elvis Peguero, and Adam Seminaris. On February 18, 2023, Renfroe won his salary arbitration case against the Angels, making his salary $11.9 million for the season rather than the team offer of $11.25 million.

Personal life
Renfroe married Courtney Beach on December 5, 2015, in their hometown of Crystal Springs. Renfroe is a Christian.

References

External links

Mississippi State bio

1992 births
Living people
Major League Baseball outfielders
San Diego Padres players
Tampa Bay Rays players
Boston Red Sox players
Milwaukee Brewers players
All-American college baseball players
Baseball players from Mississippi
Mississippi State Bulldogs baseball players
People from Crystal Springs, Mississippi
Eugene Emeralds players
Fort Wayne TinCaps players
Lake Elsinore Storm players
San Antonio Missions players
El Paso Chihuahuas players